is a former Japanese football player and manager.

Playing career
Goto was born in Shizuoka Prefecture on February 20, 1964. After graduating from Chuo University, he joined Furukawa Electric (later JEF United Ichihara) in 1986. He played many matches as midfielder from first season and the club won the champions 1986 JSL Cup and 1986 Asian Club Championship. This is first Asian champions as Japanese club. He became a regular player from 1987. He played for the club in 10 seasons and also served captain from 1994. In 1996, he moved to Japan Football League club Consadole Sapporo. He played as captain and the club won the champions in 1997 and was promoted to J1 League. In 1999, he moved to new club Yokohama FC in Japan Football League. The club won the champions in 1999 and 2000 and was promoted to J2 League. He played as regular player until 2002 and retired end of 2002 season. From 2003, although he became a coach, In July, he came back as player and retired end of the season.

Coaching career
After retirement, Goto started coaching career at Yokohama FC in 2003. He served coach for top team until he came back as player in July. From 2004, he became a manager for youth team until 2008. In 2009, he signed with Japan Football League club Arte Takasaki. However the club was disbanded end of 2011 season due to financial strain. He was the last manager for the club.

Club statistics

References

External links

1964 births
Living people
Chuo University alumni
Association football people from Shizuoka Prefecture
Japanese footballers
Japan Soccer League players
J1 League players
J2 League players
Japan Football League (1992–1998) players
Japan Football League players
JEF United Chiba players
Hokkaido Consadole Sapporo players
Yokohama FC players
Japanese football managers
Association football midfielders